Parker Canyon Lake is located in southeastern Arizona,  southwest of Sierra Vista around the Huachuca Mountains and about  north of the border with Mexico. The lake is a reservoir formed by a dam in Parker Canyon in the south end of the Canelo Hills in southwestern Cochise County. Parker Canyon is a tributary to the Santa Cruz River in the San Rafael Valley. The facilities are maintained by Coronado National Forest division of the USDA Forest Service.

Fish species
Parker Canyon Lake is stocked with rainbow trout once a month from October to March.  The lake was stocked with channel catfish which now hold a reproducing population.  The rest of the fish assemblage consist of largemouth bass, bluegill, green sunfish, redear sunfish, black bullhead, yellow bullhead, and mosquitofish.  Northern pike, which were recently abundant, recently vanished in that past few years.  Other fish that were stocked but didn't establish or their stockings ceased to exist include coho salmon, red shiners, fathead minnows, and threadfin shad.

Picture gallery

References

External links
 Arizona Fishing Locations Map
 Arizona Boating Locations Facilities Map
 Video of Parker Canyon Lake

Reservoirs in Arizona
Lakes of Cochise County, Arizona
Coronado National Forest
1965 establishments in Arizona